New Delhi Times is 1986 Hindi-language political thriller film directed by Ramesh Sharma and written by Gulzar, starring Shashi Kapoor, Sharmila Tagore, Om Puri and Kulbhushan Kharbanda in lead roles. The film is about a newspaper editor who exposes the politics-media corruption nexus.

The political drama film with a controversial storyline about political corruption and media, ran into trouble when film distributors and television refused to run the film, though later it went on to win three National Film Awards. It remains one of few Bollywood films to tackle the issue of corruption in media, which include Kundan Shah's Jaane Bhi Do Yaaron (1983), Main Azaad Hoon (1989) and Rann (2010)

Plot
The film tells the story of an honest journalist Vikas Pande (Shashi Kapoor) from Ghazipur in eastern Uttar Pradesh who moves to Delhi to run a newspaper, and soon uncovers a political assassination, and in the process, falls prey to a corrupt system and the nexus between politicians and media barons.
The film starts with the assassination of a local MLA Bhaleram in the circuit house of Ghazipur. The guard of the circuit house goes missing.
Vikas Pande is the upright and fearless executive editor of the New Delhi Times newspaper and is in the process of exposing a scandal of illegal hooch that killed hundreds of people. Meanwhile, there is a power struggle going on between the incumbent chief minister Trivedi and the ambitious MLA Ajay Singh Om Puri for the post of chief minister.

Ajay Singh is a dangerous man and linked with all types of illegal activities like drug trafficking, smuggling, extortion, looting, etc. His business is managed by his trusted lieutenant Iqbal. Iqbal is arrested in the murder case of Bhaleram.
He is the cause of frequent riots that are taking place in Ghazipur. Vikas goes to Ghazipur to cover the riots and meets locals. Here, he finds overwhelming evidences that suggest Ajay Singh is somehow linked with the murder.

On the other hand, Vikas's wife, who is a lawyer, is approached by an old man whose daughter is missing from her in-laws place, and whom they claim had gone mad. She is fighting the case.

In a tensed hearing at the court, Iqbal states that he is innocent and Ajay Singh has committed the crime. This becomes the front-page news of the New Delhi Times. Ajay Singh is very anxious and summons Vikas. Vikas confronts him directly and accuses him of the murder. In a fit of rage,  Ajay Singh reveals that he had bribed Bhaleram and his 13 MLAs and his road to chief minister's chair was almost clear. Hence, he had no motive to kill him.
Ajay Singh is constantly putting the CM under pressure, yet the CM miraculously escapes every trap. Also Vikas is threatened by goons to stop pursuing the murder case, which motivates him further.

He collates all the facts and writes an article which links Ajay Singh with the murder, but has no concrete evidence. Although reluctant to publish the article, his bosses finally concede to his demands and publish it. One fine day the old man who had earlier approached Vikas's wife for his missing daughter, comes to thank her for her efforts. It is revealed that his daughter is found at a mental asylum, where the staff and police officials were bribed to declare her mentally unfit. The old man further reveal that the guard of the circuit house is admitted in the asylum.
Vikas immediately meets the guard. The guard is an old man who tells him that he is not mentally ill and reveals all the happenings of that day. On the fateful day, his son -who is in fact a mole of Trivedi - visits him. The deal does take place with Ajay Singh but once they leave, Bhaleram is murdered by goons of Trivedi.

Vikas realizes that all the evidences were planted by Trivedi to implicate Ajay Singh and keep him under control. He is sad that he has been used by Trivedi, but then his friend Anwar consoles him saying that the person whom he has exposed deserve at least what he has done.

Cast
 Shashi Kapoor - Vikas Pande
 Sharmila Tagore - Nisha
 Om Puri - Ajay Singh
 Kulbhushan Kharbanda - J.K. (Jugal Kishor)
 A.K. Hangal - Vikas's Father
 M. K. Raina
 Manohar Singh - Jagannath Poddar
 Ram Gopal Bajaj - The Minister

Crew
 Director of Photography: Subrata Mitra
 Art Direction:           Nitish Roy
 Sound designer:          Dev Benegal

Awards

Further reading
 Two Tales of My Times: New Delhi Times, Maachis, by Gulzar. Rupa. 2008. .

References

External links
 

1986 films
1980s Hindi-language films
1980s thriller drama films
Indian political drama films
Indian political thriller films
Films about journalists
Films set in Delhi
Films featuring a Best Actor National Award-winning performance
Films whose cinematographer won the Best Cinematography National Film Award
Best Debut Feature Film of a Director National Film Award winners
1986 directorial debut films
1986 drama films